The Austro-Turkish War (1716–1718) was fought between Habsburg monarchy and the Ottoman Empire. The 1699 Treaty of Karlowitz was not an acceptable permanent agreement for the Ottoman Empire. Twelve years after Karlowitz, it began the long-term prospect of taking revenge for its defeat at the Battle of Vienna in 1683. First, the army of Turkish Grand Vizier Baltacı Mehmet defeated Peter the Great's Russian Army in the Russo-Turkish War (1710–1711). Then, during the Ottoman–Venetian War (1714–1718), Ottoman Grand Vizier Damat Ali reconquered the Morea from the Venetians. As a reaction as the guarantor of the Treaty of Karlowitz, the Austrians threatened the Ottoman Empire, which caused it to declare war in April 1716.

In 1716, Prince Eugene of Savoy defeated the Turks at the Battle of Petrovaradin. The Banat and its capital, Timişoara, were conquered by Prince Eugene in October 1716. The following year, after the Austrians captured Belgrade, the Turks sought peace, and the Treaty of Passarowitz was signed on 21 July 1718. 

The Habsburgs gained control of Belgrade, Temesvár (the last Ottoman fortress in Hungary), the Banat region, and portions of northern Serbia. Wallachia (an autonomous Ottoman vassal) ceded Oltenia (Lesser Wallachia) to the Habsburg Monarchy, which established the Banat of Craiova. The Turks retained control only of the territory south of the Danube River. The pact stipulated for Venice to surrender the Morea to the Ottomans, but it retained the Ionian Islands and made gains in Dalmatia.

References

Sources

Further reading

 

 
Conflicts in 1716
Conflicts in 1717
Conflicts in 1718
1716 in the Ottoman Empire
1717 in the Ottoman Empire
1718 in the Ottoman Empire
1716
Habsburg monarchy–Ottoman Empire relations